The Men's mass start competition of the Beijing 2022 Olympics was held on 18 February, at the National Biathlon Centre, in the Zhangjiakou cluster of competition venues,  north of Beijing, at an elevation of . Johannes Thingnes Bø of Norway won the event. Martin Ponsiluoma of Sweden won the silver medal, his first Olympic medal, and Vetle Sjåstad Christiansen of Norway won bronze, his first individual Olympic medal.

Summary
All three 2018 medalists, the champion Martin Fourcade, Simon Schempp, and Emil Hegle Svendsen, retired from competitions. The overall leader of the 2021–22 Biathlon World Cup before the Olympics was Quentin Fillon Maillet, and the leader in the mass start was Benedikt Doll, with Fillon Maillet second.

After the third shooting, Johannes Thingnes Bø was leading, despite two penalty loops. Ponsiluoma and Fillon Maillet were 20-25 seconds behind. The next pursuers, Christian Gow and Sebastian Samuelsson, were a minute behind Bø. At the last shooting, Bø had to ski two penalty loops, Fillon Maillet three, and Ponsiluoma one. Bø still emerged as a leader, with Ponsiluoma 18 seconds behind. Vetle Sjåstad Christiansen was third, 45 seconds behind Bø, and Fillon Maillet was further 20 seconds behind Sjåstad Christiansen. They finished in the same order.

Qualification

Results
The race was started at 17:00.

References

Biathlon at the 2022 Winter Olympics
Men's biathlon at the 2022 Winter Olympics